Fholisani Sydney Mufamadi (born 28 February 1959) is a South African politician. He was Minister of Safety and Security from 1994 to 1999 and Minister of Provincial and Local Government from 1999 to 2008.

Early life
Mufamadi was born on 28 February 1959 in Alexandra Township, Johannesburg, the eldest of the four children of Masindi and Reuben Mufamadi. He grew up in Meadowlands, Gauteng, and Tshisahulu, Venda (today Limpopo Province), where he first looked after his grandfather's cattle before attending school. Both his father and mother worked in Johannesburg, selling home-brewed alcoholic beverages to supplement the family income. His mother was subsequently arrested for illegally selling alcohol, and thus he experienced the apartheid era legal system first-hand at an early age.

Education
Mufamadi completed his schooling at Khwevha High School in Shayandima, Venda, in 1977.

He holds a Master of Science degree in State, Society and Development from the University of London, and is a Doctoral candidate there specializing in Political Economy of Automotive Manufacturing.

Anti-apartheid work
In 1976, with the spread of the Soweto uprising into other areas of the country, Mufamadi became a member of Zoutpansberg Students Organisation, which led to the boycotts in Venda during October 1977. Many student leaders were arrested, and others, including Mufamadi, went underground. When the schools re-opened, he was refused re-admission and was briefly prevented from completing his schooling. He moved to Johannesburg and enrolled at an international Correspondence College.

In 1977, he joined the African National Congress, the next year he was a founder member of the Azanian People's Organisation and in 1981 he joined the South African Communist Party. His involvement in AZAPO led to two months' detention without trial at John Vorster Square, Johannesburg, under section 6 of the Terrorism Act.

In 1980, Mufamadi worked as a private teacher at Lamula Secondary School, Soweto, where he assisted members of the Congress of South African Students with political activities. In 1981, he left the teaching profession to work as a messenger for a firm of attorneys and subsequently joined the General and Allied Workers Union and participated in the 16 June stay-away that year. After his employer saw a newspaper clipping of Mufamadi addressing the workers, he was fired for taking part in political activities. He worked voluntarily for GAWU, and in 1982 and 1984 was elected General Secretary of the organisation. In 1983, he attended the launch of the United Democratic Front in Cape Town, and was later elected Transvaal publicity secretary of the organisation, a position he held until 1990. In 1984 he was detained twice in the Ciskei during April and again in September.

Following the successful Transvaal regional stay-away in November 1984, Mufamadi was subpoenaed to appear as a state witness at the trial of some of its organisers. However, when some of the accused fled the country, charges were withdrawn and he was not called to testify. In 1985, when the state of emergency was declared, Mufamadi operated underground to avoid detention, resurfacing to help organise and attend the December 1985 launch of the Congress of South African Trade Unions in Durban, where he was elected Assistant General Secretary at its inaugural rally. He operated underground from June 1986 to October 1986, but openly resumed his work despite the continuing state of emergency. He was again detained on 8 June 1987 for political activities.

In June 1988, Mufamadi headed a planning committee to organise an anti-apartheid conference in Cape Town, which aimed to include delegates from a broad spectrum of anti-apartheid organisations. In September 1988, the government prohibited the conference and restricted the organisers of the conference from entering Cape Town for a ten-day period. In January 1990, he travelled with the Rivonia Trialists to Lusaka, Zambia, to meet with the ANC Executive Committee. In 1991, he was elected to the party's central committee, and was elected to the party's National Executive Committee and to serve on its working committee at an ANC congress held in Durban in July later that year.  He did not stand for re-election as COSATU Assistant General Secretary that year. He was an SACP delegate at the Convention for a Democratic South Africa working group, which dealt with the future of the independent Bantustans, or homelands.

Government work
After the 1994 general election, Mufamadi was appointed as Minister of Safety and Security in the Government of National Unity until 1999, after having served on the sub-council on law and order of the Transitional Executive Council.

Mufamadi has been the Minister of Provincial and Local Government since 17 June 1999. Following the resignation of President Mbeki in September 2008, Mufamadi was among those members of the Cabinet who submitted their resignations on September 23.

Personal life
Mufamadi is married to Nomusa and has three children.

References

External links
Department of Provincial and Local Government website
Reference source from SAHistory.org
Minister Mufamadi's daughter said to have stolen R48 000 from the Fourways High school tuckshop

1959 births
Living people
People from Alexandra, Gauteng
Alumni of the University of London
South African Venda people
South African Communist Party politicians
African National Congress politicians
Azanian People's Organisation politicians
Government ministers of South Africa